Pak Sadat Colony is a neighbourhood in the Korangi District in eastern Karachi, Pakistan. It was previously part of Shah Faisal Town, which was an administrative unit that was disbanded in 2011.

There are several ethnic groups in Pak Sadat Colony including Muhajirs, Sindhis, Kashmiris, Seraikis, Pakhtuns, Balochis, Memons, Bohras and Ismailis.

See also
 Shah Faisal Town
 Sadat Colony
 Karachi

References

External links 
 Karachi Website

Neighbourhoods of Karachi
Shah Faisal Town